Phelelani Mpangase (born 30 December 1983 in Durban) is a South African association football defender for Platinum Stars.

Mpangase is a versatile player who can be deployed as a central defender and as a wingback.

References

1983 births
Living people
Association football defenders
Sportspeople from Durban
South African soccer players
SuperSport United F.C. players
Nathi Lions F.C. players
Mamelodi Sundowns F.C. players
Platinum Stars F.C. players
Thanda Royal Zulu F.C. players
South African Premier Division players
National First Division players